Pine Beach can refer to:
Pine Beach, New Jersey
Pine Beach station, a railway station in Dorval, Quebec, Canada